General elections were held in Peru on 2 July 1950 to elect the President and both houses of Congress. Manuel A. Odría was the only presidential candidate after Ernesto Montage of the Democratic League withdrew, and was elected unopposed. In the Congressional elections, lists supporting Odría won 38 of the 47 seats in the Senate and 139 of the 156 seats in the Chamber of Deputies.

Results

President

Senate
Only 45 of the 47 seats in the Senate were filled as only one list of candidates was registered in Ancash and Puno, resulting in their minority seats being unfilled.

Chamber of Deputies
Only 154 of the 156 seats in the Chamber were filled as only one list of candidates was registered in Ancash and Puno, resulting in their minority seats being unfilled.

References

1950 in Peru
Elections in Peru
Peru
Single-candidate elections
Presidential elections in Peru
Election and referendum articles with incomplete results
Peru